WXSP-CD (channel 15) is a low-power, Class A television station licensed to Grand Rapids, Michigan, United States, serving West Michigan as an affiliate of MyNetworkTV. It is owned by Nexstar Media Group alongside Grand Rapids–licensed NBC affiliate WOOD-TV (channel 8) and Battle Creek–licensed ABC affiliate WOTV (channel 41). The stations share studios on College Avenue Southeast in the Heritage Hill section of Grand Rapids, while WXSP-CD's transmitter is located in Walker (along I-96).

Repeaters
Due to its low-power status, WXSP-CD's broadcasting radius only covers the immediate Grand Rapids area. Therefore, in order to serve the entire Grand Rapids–Kalamazoo–Battle Creek market, it is relayed on four Class A translators that usually repeat WXSP-CD's programming, but currently all share in hosting the market's ATSC 3.0 signals:

History
The station signed on the air on July 23, 1986, as W29AD, broadcasting on UHF channel 29. It moved to UHF channel 15 and acquired the W15AM calls on January 12, 1988. In the station's early days, it was a translator for World Harvest Television from WHME-TV in South Bend, Indiana, which is owned by LeSEA Broadcasting (now Family Broadcasting Corporation). The station was then purchased by LIN TV, the owner of WOOD-TV, and converted to the station's Local Weather Station (LWS) format with the call sign WOWD-LP (variation on WOOD-TV). WOWD and its low-power network of repeaters aired 24-hour weather information direct from WOOD-TV's weather center, including current conditions and severe weather coverage. This was in an early pre-digital format comparable to the now defunct NBC Weather Plus.

The weather programming aired from the mid-1990s until it switched to a general entertainment programming format a few years later. It featured graphic displays of various current conditions and forecasts as well as periodic forecast segments from WOOD-TV's meteorologists. Short commercial breaks would feature promotional advertising for WOOD-TV's news and entertainment programming, as well as LWS' station identification. A format change took place when it became a UPN affiliate on August 31, 1999 (displacing that network from secondary carriage on WOOD-TV and WOTV), prompting the move of LWS to the early morning hours and the adoption of new calls, WXSP-LP. The call-sign WXSP-CA was acquired after it became a Class A station, which meets stricter requirements than most low-powered television stations. WXSP-CD continues to carry WOOD-TV's radar in late night weekend slots when paid programming is unable to be sold.

On January 24, 2006, the Warner Bros. unit of Time Warner and CBS Corporation announced that the two companies would shut down The WB and UPN and combine the networks' respective programming to create a new "fifth" network called The CW. On February 22, 2006, News Corporation announced the launch of a new "sixth" network called MyNetworkTV, which would be operated by Fox Television Stations and its syndication division Twentieth Television. MyNetworkTV was created to compete against another upstart network that would launch at the same time that September, The CW (an amalgamated network that was originally consisted primarily of UPN and The WB's higher-rated programs) as well as to give UPN and WB stations that were not mentioned as becoming CW affiliates another option besides converting to independent stations.

CBS affiliate WWMT (channel 3) announced on April 4 that it would affiliate with The CW on a new second digital subchannel. WXSP became available as a MyNetworkTV affiliate partly because then-WB affiliate WZPX-TV (channel 43) was also an i: Independent Television (now Ion) owned-and-operated station and ran WB programming on a 22-hour delay (prime time shows ran at 6 p.m. the night after the original broadcast and the Kids' WB Saturday block aired at 5 a.m. on Sunday mornings). As a result, Southwestern Michigan is one of the largest markets in which The CW was only available via digital subchannel/cable and on an entirely new station. It was reported that WXSP was in discussions to join The CW, but due to the station's heavy reliance upon professional sports during prime time and the network's concerns over preempted programming, the two sides could not come to an agreement.

For the final two weeks of UPN's existence, Fox affiliate WXMI (channel 17) aired WWE Smackdown until WWMT-DT2's launch. WXSP joined MyNetworkTV on September 5, while WWMT-DT2 signed on with The CW on September 18. On July 21, 2010, WXSP flash-cut from analog to a digital signal. The call letters were changed to WXSP-CD on August 30. In late-October 2010, LIN TV discontinued the simulcast of WXSP on WOTV-DT2, replacing it with a new digital subchannel network, TheCoolTV (which it discontinued on July 15, 2013). On July 1, 2013, LIN TV ended the simulcast of WXSP on WOOD-DT2, replacing that signal with Bounce TV.

On March 21, 2014, it was announced that Media General would acquire LIN. The deal closed on December 19, bringing WXSP, along with WOOD and WOTV, under common ownership with CBS affiliate WLNS-TV in Lansing.

On January 27, 2016, Media General announced that it had entered into a definite agreement to be acquired by Nexstar Broadcasting Group. The combined company was named Nexstar Media Group, and owned at the time 171 stations (including WOOD, WOTV and WXSP), serving an estimated 39% of households. Due to their low-power status, the WXSP-CD network of stations was not affected by the Nexstar-Tribune merger involving the spin-off of Tribune's WXMI to Scripps.

Programming
Overnights, WXSP airs a live feed of WOOD-TV's Doppler weather radar (known as "Storm Track Live"), along with NOAA Weather Radio broadcast audio. The station may sometimes air ABC or NBC programming in the event of preemptions by WOTV or WOOD-TV.

The station was the Grand Rapids home for the former Detroit Pistons, Detroit Red Wings, and Big Ten Conference syndicated packages.

Newscasts
On October 21, 2007, WXSP introduced a 10 PM newscast produced by sister station WOOD-TV, titled News 8 at 10:00. The half-hour newscast competes with Fox station WXMI's hour-long prime time newscast, and later began to compete with a WWMT-produced program for its CW subchannel.

Technical information

Subchannels
WXSP-CD's ATSC 1.0 channels are carried on the multiplexed digital signals of other West Michigan television stations, to the advantage of being at those station's full-power despite WXSP-CD's low-power status:

ATSC 3.0
The station's digital signal is multiplexed, with WOLP-CD also maintaining the same channel map arrangement:

References

External links
WOOD-TV
WOTV

Television channels and stations established in 1986
1986 establishments in Michigan
XSP-CD
Low-power television stations in the United States
ATSC 3.0 television stations
MyNetworkTV affiliates
Cozi TV affiliates
Ion Mystery affiliates
Nexstar Media Group